The Right Here Right Now Tour was a concert tour by American hard rock band Van Halen in support of their live double album and the accompanying video Live: Right Here, Right Now.

Background
Following a European tour in support of the live album's release, the band went out on a summer-long tour in North America. Approximately 31 of its 41 shows were sold out, and was in support of the anti-hunger organization USA Harvest. Groton had the only show not sold out by the end of the tour, as the state at the time had a shaky economy. The Groton show was almost cancelled because of a thunderstorm, but the band continued to perform, despite the danger.

The tour was the shortest ever promotion undertaken by the band, if previous tours that were promoting the same album were combined and the 2007 reunion tour's lack of actual promotion are taken into account. This was possibly since all the other tours were in promotion of albums of new material to advertise. This made for a more varied setlist than any previous tour and was the band's only 'greatest hits' tour until the 2004 and 2007 reunion tours.

Reception
The tour was met with positive reviews, with the Detroit Free Press stating that the concerts were "blessedly devoid of the usual hard rock glitz and gimmickry" while Cleveland Plain Dealer had said that the band consistently delivered one of the most energetic and entertaining rock 'n' roll shows.

Scott Iwasaki, a staff writer from the Deseret News gave the performance in Park City a positive review. He opened his statement, saying that rock 'n' roll was meant to be played live when the band pushed the "arena sound" into heavy metal while performing to an audience of 14,000 that were singing along and full of adrenaline and enthusiasm. He praised the dynamics of the songs, which were noted as magical and energetic, as well as acknowledging the individual solo acts done by the band members. He claimed that Anthony had performed a powerful bass solo, pushing his bass guitar to the limits while the notes rumbled throughout. He also added on Alex Van Halen's drum solo, who he stated had plastered his drum set with neck-breaking speed and precision, with each hit of the snare and roll of the toms shaking the venue, with cheers from the audience when he performed a latin-rhythm interlude to prevent his solo from being drawn out.

Setlists

Europe
"Poundcake"
"Judgement Day"
"Runaround"
"When It's Love"
"There's Only One Way To Rock"
"Bass Solo"
"Pleasure Dome"
"Drum Solo"
"Panama"
"Right Now"
"Why Can't This Be Love"
"Finish What Ya Started"
"Eagles Fly"
"Guitar Solo"
"Unchained"
"5150"
"Best Of Both Worlds"
"Top Of The World"
"Ain't Talkin Bout Love"
"Jump"
Encore
"You Really Got Me"

North America
"Mine All Mine"
"Why Can't This Be Love"
"Poundcake"
"Judgement Day"
"Panama"
"Love Walks In"
"Runaround"
"Bass Solo"
"Best Of Both Worlds"
"Pleasure Dome"
"Drum Solo"
"Dreams"
"Right Now"
"Finish What Ya Started"
"Give To Live"
"Eagles Fly"
"Top Of The World"
"Guitar Solo"
"Unchained"
"There's Only One Way To Rock"
"Ain't Talkin Bout Love"
"Jump"
Encore
"You Really Got Me"
"Rockin In The Free World"

Tour dates

Box office score data

Personnel
 Eddie Van Halen – guitar, backing vocals
 Michael Anthony – bass, backing vocals, keyboards
 Alex Van Halen – drums
 Sammy Hagar – lead vocals, guitar

Additional musician
 Alan Fitzgerald – keyboards

References

Van Halen concert tours
1993 concert tours